Guido Andreozzi and Guillermo Durán were the defending champions but chose not to defend their title.

Yuki Bhambri and Saketh Myneni won the title after defeating Nuno Borges and Francisco Cabral 6–4, 3–6, [10–6] in the final.

Seeds

Draw

References

External links
 Main draw

Porto Challenger - Doubles